You Will Be My Son, is a French tragedy film directed by Gilles Legrand. It is co-written by Legrand, Sandrine Cayron, and Delphine de Vigan, and stars Niels Arestrup and Lorànt Deutsch in the main roles. It was released in France on 24 August 2011.

Plot
Arestrup plays Paul de Marseul, a passionate and demanding winemaker dissatisfied at the prospect of his son, Martin (Lorànt Deutsch), taking over his vineyard. He dreams of a more talented successor, and finds him in the person of Phillipe (Nicolas Bridet), the son of his steward, François (Patrick Chesnais). M. de Marseul lavishes attention and praise on Phillipe while disparaging Martin's efforts, eventually inviting Phillipe rather than Martin to attend his investiture in the Legion d'honneur.

Reception
Christy Lemire of RogerEbert.com gave the film 3½ out of 4 stars, and called it "the stuff of Greek tragedy," while praising its tonal and narrative control.  Le Figaro gave the film three out of four stars and called it "a great vintage."

Cast
Niels Arestrup - Paul de Marseul
Lorànt Deutsch - Martin de Marseul
Patrick Chesnais - François Amelot
Nicolas Bridet - Philippe Amelot
Anne Marivin - Alice
Valérie Mairesse - Madeleine Amelot
Xavier Robic - Lacourt's son
Urbain Cancelier - Lacourt's father
Shirley Bousquet - Jessica, barmaid
Jean-Marc Roulot - Doctor Vermont
Nicolas Marié - The Notary
Hélène de Saint-Père - The Journalist

References

External links
 
 
 Official website (USA) (Cohen Media Group is the US distributor)
Official website (France) 

2011 films
Films directed by Gilles Legrand
French drama films
2010s French-language films
2011 drama films
2010s French films